Kim Gun-mo (born January 13, 1968) is a South Korean singer-songwriter, who is considered the country's most successful musical artist of the 1990s. His 1995 album, Wrongful Meeting, previously held the Guinness World Record for the best-selling album of all time in South Korea. Since his debut in 1992, Kim has released 13 full-length albums and has won numerous awards, including Album of the Year at the Golden Disc Awards for three consecutive years from 1994 to 1996. In 2011, he received a presidential commendation from the South Korean government for his contributions to popular culture.

Early life 
Kim was born on January 13, 1968, in Busan, South Korea. He was interested in music from a young age and started playing the piano when he was four years old. He attended elementary school, middle school, and high school in Seoul and graduated from Seoul Institute of the Arts. He served in the South Korean Navy in the late 1980s.

Personal life 
Kim is engaged to pianist Jang Ji-yeon, whom he met through a mutual friend. Later in June 2022, Kim is about to agree to divorce his wife.

On December 6, 2019, lawyer Kang Yong-suk announced that he is representing a woman who alleges that Kim sexually assaulted her. On December 8, Kang also said that he was representing another client who had similar allegations against Kim. Kim has stated that he will take legal action against Kang.

Career 

Kim debuted with Kim Gun Mo 1 in 1992, which was followed by his second album Excuse in 1993. His third album Mis-Encounter came out in 1995. In the following year, he released Exchange. As one of the most popular Korean entertainers, Kim holds the record for biggest selling album in Korea with his third studio album, which sold over 3.3 million copies.  Kim's albums rank consistently high on Korean music charts; his 8th album, ‘He-story,’ was the best-selling album of 2003. His most famous songs include "Excuse", "Mis-Encounter", and "Jjangga". In 2004, he released his 9th album Kim Gun Mo 9 which is reminiscent of his first album. This album was his second restarting point in his music career. In the following year, he came up with BE Like...which was also a huge success in Korea. His most recent work was released in 2008, entitled, Soul Groove.

Discography

Studio albums

Extended plays

Filmography

Variety shows

Awards and nominations

State honors

See also
 List of best-selling albums in South Korea

Notes

References

1968 births
Living people
People from Busan
South Korean rhythm and blues singers
South Korean pop pianists
Grand Prize Golden Disc Award recipients
Grand Prize Seoul Music Award recipients
MAMA Award winners
Male pianists
21st-century pianists
21st-century South Korean male singers
South Korean male singer-songwriters